Hyagnis pakistanus is a species of beetle in the family Cerambycidae. It was described by Breuning in 1975.

The larvae can drill into wood and cause damage to live wood or logs that have been felled.

References

pakistanus
Beetles described in 1975